The World Police and Fire Games (WPFG) is a biennial athletic event, open to active and retired law enforcement and fire service personnel throughout the world. The WPFG Federation is an arm of the California Police Athletic Federation (CPAF), an American non-profit organization.

The Games attract approximately 10,000 entrants, slightly fewer than the Summer Olympic Games, and exceeding the third position holder, the Commonwealth Games. In the early 2010s, The United Kingdom hosted all three events consecutively; the 2012 Summer Olympics in London, England, followed by the 2013 World Police and Fire Games in Belfast, Northern Ireland, and ending with Glasgow, Scotland, hosting the 2014 Commonwealth Games - the first time all three events have been hosted by the same nation consecutively.

The host city of the 2015 World Police and Fire Game was Fairfax County, Virginia, in the United States, with venues located around the Washington metropolitan area.

In 2017, the Games were scheduled to be held in the city of Montreal, however, Montreal backed out of their hosting duties after a labour dispute between the city and its fire department.  The Games were quickly rescheduled and successfully held in Los Angeles.

In 2019 the host city was Chengdu in China.

The WPFG 2021 were postponed until 2022 because of the COVID-19 pandemic.

In 2022 the host city will be Rotterdam, the Netherlands.

The following event will be hosted in Winnipeg, Manitoba in Canada.

History
The California Police Olympics were first held in 1967. The concept evolved over the years and led to the creation of the World Police & Fire Games Federation—a non-profit organization, run by the Californian Police Athletics Federation—in 1983. Two years later, in 1985, the first World Police & Fire Games were held in San Jose, California, USA, with nearly 5,000 competitors.

The largest WPFG games to date was held in New York, New York, USA with over 16,000 athletes in attendance, from 59 nations.

The most successful and best organised was in Belfast, Northern Ireland in 2013. It was described, by the President of the World Police and Fire Games Federation, Mike Graham, as "the friendliest and best Games ever".

The Montreal Firefighters Association called for a boycott of the 2017 Games, which were held in their own city, in protest against forced changes to their collective agreements and pension funds by the City of Montreal and the Quebec provincial government. Labor unions representing over 100,000 firefighters and civil servants joined Montreal's firefighters in the boycott.

Games

See also
World Firefighters Games
World Military Games
World Police Indoor Soccer Tournament
USIP World Police Games
European Police and Fire Games
World Police Concert

References

External links
WPFG 2017 Official Website. Los Angeles 2017 World Police and Fire Games official website
WPFG 2015 official website. Fairfax 2015 World Police and Fire Games official website
WPFG 2022 official website.  Rotterdam 2022 World Police and Fire Games official website
 California Police Athletic Federation (CPAF) official website
 United States Police and Fire Championships. CPAF official website

Firefighting competitions
Law enforcement
Multi-sport events
Recurring sporting events established in 1985
Workers' sport
Biennial sporting events